This is a list of members of the Council of the German Cultural Community between 1978 and 1981, following the direct elections of 1978.

Sources
 

List
1970s in Belgium
1980s in Belgium